Sanam Teri Kasam is a 2016 Indian romantic tragedy film, directed by the duo Radhika Rao-Vinay Sapru and produced by Deepak Mukut. It stars Harshvardhan Rane and Mawra Hocane in lead roles, marking their Hindi film debut. The film is a modern rendition of the novel Love Story by Eric Segal. 

The film was released worldwide on 5 February 2016 under Eros International.

Plot
A huge crowd of people and the media congratulates lawyer Inder Lal Parihaar after he wins a case. Later, he purchases a bottle of champagne and returns home to face a tree, as a flashback ensues.

Saraswati "Saru" Parthasaarthy is an extremely traditional, Telugu, young librarian, who gets rejected by many suitors who find her "old-fashioned" and "unappealing". Her younger sister Kaveri's fiancé issues her an ultimatum to marry him within a month or else move on. But her strict father, Jayram Parthasarthy says that her wedding cannot happen till Saru gets married. Enraged, Kaveri insults her and threatens to elope. Saru begs her not to elope and hurt Jayram, and promises Kaveri that she will find a husband soon.

Living in the same building is Inder Lal Parihaar, then a handsome ex-convict, who is known for his tough attitude and for his well cherished physique . He is in a relationship with renowned fashionista stylist Ruby Malhotra. Jayram views them as a bad influence to the society as he finds them embarrassing. After a few days, however, they break up. Saru and Inder first meet in the lift and have subsequent meetings in the library where Saru works.

When Saru's parents are out of town, Saru secretly meets Inder and seeks help to get her a makeover appointment from Ruby. She wants to impress her office crush, Abhimanyu Shastry, who holds a degree in IIT. During their conversation, a drunken Ruby barges in and presumes Inder to be cheating on her; in a fit of rage, she insults Saru and throws her wine bottle on Saru and leaves, but Inder shields her and gets badly injured. Saru helps Inder to his bed while the watchman approaches Inder's apartment and, misunderstanding them in an intimate position, alerts all the elders of the society. Unaware, Saru helps Inder tend to his wounds despite his reluctance. Jayram returns early from his trip. He and the elders find Saru with Inder on his bed, completely misunderstanding the situation, while Jayram disowns her.

Saru tells her mother Arundhati what really happened that night, but asks her not to tell Jayram, because he has finally consented for Kaveri's wedding. Inder helps her find an apartment and also get her a makeover with help from a local hairdresser, Mushtaqeen. With her new makeover, she grabs the attention of Abhimanyu. Meanwhile, Inder falls in love with her, but keeps quiet when Abhimanyu proposes to her, because he wants her to be happy. However, Abhimanyu rejects her on the day of the wedding, because his father does not want a disowned daughter-in-law. Saru is left heartbroken and goes to her honeymoon suite. From there, Saru and Inder spend the night together. The next morning, Inder witnesses Saru embracing Abhimanyu and leaves heartbroken. Inder spirals into depression, breaking off all contacts with Saru. When he learns from Abhimanyu that Saru had actually rejected Abhimanyu's request for a second chance, he tracks her down and finds her in a Buddhist monastery, where he professes his love to her. Saru passes out and Inder takes her to the hospital, where he discovers she is suffering from meningioma and has very few days to live. He forcibly enters Saru's parents' house and demands them to stop pretending that their daughter is dead. The next day he is arrested for charges pressed by Jayram. Saru gets discharged and goes to the library, where she discovers the secret messages Inder left for her in check-out slips, realizing that he has loved her from the beginning. The two unite and Saru asks Inder to marry her.

That night, Saru tells him that after her death, she desires to be buried under a beautiful flowering tree. Inder meets Jayram and tells him that he is marrying Saru and can even die for her. On their wedding day, Saru's parents arrive and accept their wedding. Saru faints after the wedding and gets hospitalised. Her parents learn about her disease, and Jayram feels heartbroken and guilty. Inder asks his father, Rajinder Lal Parihar, with whom he has a strained relationship, to acquire for him the land under the tree for Saru's burial. Saru dies in Inder's arms, and Inder is left heartbroken. Inder finds Rajinder in the hospital and reconciles with him.

Now a successful lawyer, Inder stands at the tree that marks Saru's grave. He asserts that she must be happy to see him successful and sober. He says that he misses her and expresses a promise of eternal true love.

Cast
 Harshvardhan Rane as Inder Lal Parihaar, Saru's husband
 Mawra Hocane as Saraswati "Saru" Parihaar (nee Parthasaarthy) , Inder's wife 
 Manish Choudhary as Jayram Parthasaarthy, Saru's father
 Pyumori Mehta Ghosh as Arundhati Parthasaarthy, Saru's mother
 Divyetta Singh as Kaveri Parthasaarthy, Saru's sister
 Anurag Sinha as Abhimanyu Shastry, Saru's ex-fiancée
 Murli Sharma as Inspector Hari Nikam
 Shraddha Das as Ruby Malhotra, Inder's ex-girlfriend
 Ripu Daman Singh as Sanjay, Kaveri's husband
 Vijay Raaz as Mushtaqeen Bhai
 Sudesh Berry as Rajinder Lal Parihaar, Inder's father
 Rushad Rana as Doctor, Saru's doctor
 Siddhant Ghegadmal as Amit, one of Saru's suitor
 Alok Pandey as watchman
 Ravii Sharma as Pandit
 Krishna Rathod

Release
The first look of the film was unveiled on 7 December 2015 by Eros Now via a tweet and was scheduled for release on 8 January 2016. Trailer of the film was released on 15 December 2015 with a new release date of 5 February. Film was released worldwide on 5 February 2016 under the production banner of Eros Now.

Soundtrack

The songs were composed by Himesh Reshammiya. Lyrics were penned by Sameer Anjaan, Shabbir Ahmed, Reshammiya and Subrat Sinha. The title track was released on 22 December 2015, and complete album was released on 7 January 2016. The film's music Himesh Reshammiya

Reception

Box-office
The film was declared "above average" at the box office by all the trade publications.

Critical reception
The film received mixed to positive reviews from critics. Hindustan Times gave it 3 out of 5 stars and wrote, "With brilliant production values and performances, it manages to draw you into the lives of Saru and Inder and moistens your eyes too. The last fifteen minutes of the film, which drags a bit. Else, theirs is a love story that will touch your heart without a doubt." Bollywood Hungama gave it 2.5 out of 5 stars and said, "Sanam Teri Kasam is a decent assortment of good performances and superb music. However, the excessive length of the film will act as a biggest single drawback at the box-office."

Times of India gave it 2.5 out of 5 stars and wrote, "As long as the focus stays on its leads, the film does a good job, from Inder softening every time he is around Saraswati, to watching them goof around in Kheech Meri Photo, they are a treat from the word go." News18 gave it 2 out of 5 stars and said, "The cast and the music deserves a mention. The 155 minutes for a cliché love story amidst an ugly-duckling-turning-into-swan is just too much."

Awards and nominations

Sequel
Harshvardhan Rane, the lead actor of the first film announced the sequel with him returning to the cast. 

Director Vinay Sapru said, "We’re really happy that we could crack a story for this one. It moves ahead - it talks about what happens to Harshvardha Rane's character after Mawra Hocane’s character dies in the first outing."

References

External links
 
 
 

2016 films
2010s Hindi-language films
2010s romantic musical films
2016 romantic drama films
Indian romantic musical films
Indian romantic drama films
Films based on American novels
Films set in Mumbai
Indian films about cancer